Mark Wilson's Complete Course in Magic is a book on magic written by magician Mark Wilson.
The book is a popular reference for magicians and has been in print since its first issue in 1975.

Description of  Mark Wilson's Complete Course in Magic 
This description is based on the 1988 edition.

The book is organized into sections; each devoted to a particular topic, as follows:

Introductory sections 
 Table of Contents
 Listing of all sections and effects with page numbers.
 This volume contains no index.
 Dedication
 Introductory Letter
 Mark Wilson addresses his reader as "Dear Student," and expounds on his views of the basics of performance magic.
 Throughout, Wilson refers to illusions as "tricks."

Biographies 
 Mark Wilson
 Nani Darnell Wilson (his wife and partner on stage)
 Greg Wilson (their son)
 Walter Gibson, co-author
 U.F. "Gen" Grant, co-author
 Larry Anderson, co-author
 Rakesh Menon, Budding Magician

Practice Makes Perfect

Misdirection 
Wilson's exposition on the basics of misdirection.

Acknowledgements and Credits 
Course Coordinator: Larry Anderson
Assistant Course Coordinator: Don Wayne

Illusions (Tricks) 
The main body of the book comprises tricks (Wilson's term) and prerequisite techniques and skills required to perform them.  The key elements are illustrated with line drawings and explained in detail in the accompanying text.

Each trick is divided into logical sub-sections:
 Effect
 What the audience is intended to see
 Secret and Preparation
 Setting up the props, and how they work.
 Method
 How the performer achieves the effect, step by step.
 Comments and Suggestions
 Tips, pointers, and hard-won experience from the authors.

Card Magic 
The section on card effects is divided into classes of tricks; each class contains multiple individual techniques and tricks, as follows:

 Card Magic
 Self-Working Card Tricks
 The Hindu Shuffle
 Overhand Shuffle
 Forcing A Card
 The Double Lift
 The Glide
 Double-Backed Card
 Double-Faced Card
 The Short Card
 Giant Cards
 Special Card Tricks
 Flourishes
 Genii Cards

Money Magic 
As with Card Magic, the section on money effects is divided into classes of tricks; each class comprises multiple individual techniques and tricks, as follows:
 Money Magic
 Money Magic — Bills

Rope Magic 
The section on rope effects is not divided, but comprises multiple individual techniques and tricks.

Silk & Handkerchief Magic 
This section comprises multiple individual techniques and tricks.

Impromptu Magic 
This section comprises multiple individual techniques and tricks, mainly with household objects readily at hand.

Mental Magic 
This section comprises multiple individual techniques and tricks.

Betchas 
This section comprises multiple individual techniques and tricks of the kind which the magician might bet he can do something the spectator cannot: "I'll bet you."

Make At Home Magic 
This section comprises multiple individual techniques and tricks, requiring apparatus which can be constructed as build-it-yourself projects.

Sponge Ball Magic 
This section comprises multiple individual techniques and tricks, requiring compressible balls as props.

Billiard Ball Magic 
This section comprises multiple individual techniques and tricks with incompressible balls.

Cups & Balls 
Perhaps the first illusions performed; definitely the first recorded in writing (in ancient Egypt).  This section comprises multiple individual techniques and tricks.

Magical Illusions 
"In magical terms an "Illusion" is any trick or effect involving a human being."  (p. 435) This section comprises multiple individual illusions, according to the quoted definition.

Your Future In Magic 
Wilson and co-authors' parting words of encouragement to their readers and students.

References 

1975 books
Magic books